Charles Terry may refer to:

 Charles Edward Michael Terry (1897–1980), Hong Kong businessman
 Charles L. Terry, Jr. (1900–1970), American lawyer and politician from Delaware